Wulff is a German family surname and may refer to:

People
Christian Wulff (born 1959), German politician, former president of Germany
Bettina Wulff (born 1973), wife of Christian
Erwin Neutzsky-Wulff (born 1949), Danish philosopher and author
Evgenii Wulff (1885–1941), Russian botanist
George Wulff (1863–1925), Russian cristallographe
Kai Wulff (fl. 1980–2001), German-born American actor
Marte Wulff, Norwegian singer and songwriter
Mikaela Wulff (born 1990), Finnish competitive sailor
Lee Wulff (1905-1991), American sportsman
Wilhelm Wulff, Nazi occult astrologer

Science 

 Wulffite, an alkali copper sulfate mineral with the chemical formula K3NaCu4O2(SO4)4
 Wulff net, special graph paper designed to read stereographic projections

Other uses
Wulff (comics), a fictional mutant character in the Marvel 2099 setting
Wulffmorgenthaler, a webcomic and newspaper comic strip

See also
Wolff, a surname
Wulf

German-language surnames